The 1877 Atlantic hurricane season lasted from mid-summer to late-fall. Records show that in 1877 there were eight cyclones, of which five were tropical storms and three were hurricanes, one of which became a major hurricane (Category 3+). However, in the absence of modern satellite and other remote-sensing technologies, only storms that affected populated land areas or encountered ships at sea were recorded, so the actual total could be higher. An undercount bias of zero to six tropical cyclones per year between 1851 and 1885 and zero to four per year between 1886 and 1910 has been estimated.



Season summary 

The Atlantic hurricane database (HURDAT) recognizes eight tropical cyclones for the 1877 season. Five were tropical storms and three were hurricanes, with winds of 75 mph (119 km/h) or greater. The first storm was a tropical storm which formed near the Turks & Caicos Islands on August 1. It traveled parallel to the US east coast to make landfall in New Brunswick on August 5. The second storm of the season formed as a tropical storm in the Gulf of Mexico on September 14. It developed into a Category 1 hurricane which first struck Louisiana on September 18, then Florida the next day before dissipating in the Atlantic on
September 21. Hurricane Three was a Category 1 hurricane that existed between September 16 and 22 without making landfall. Hurricane Four was the strongest and most destructive storm of the season and impacted both Venezuela and Florida. Most notably, Hurricane Four caused 84 fatalities in the United States. Tropical Storm Five existed between September 24 and September 29 in which period it traveled from north of Hispaniola to a point off the south-east coast of the United States. Tropical Storm Six existed for a few days in mid-October without making landfall. Tropical Storm Seven formed in the western Gulf of Mexico, tracked parallel to the US Gulf coast and crossed the Florida peninsula between October 24 and October 28. The last storm of the season was known to have existed for two days in November. It dissipated off the Newfoundland coast on November 29.

Systems

Tropical Storm One 

A tropical storm was first observed to the north of Turks and Caicos Islands on August 1. It tracked along the eastern edge of the Bahamas, before paralleling the east coast of the United States. By August 2, the tropical storm was nearly a hurricane, though records show that winds never exceeded 70 mph (113 km/h). It gradually weakened as it headed generally north. The storm finally made landfall in New Brunswick as a 60 mph (96 km/h) tropical storm on August 5. Later it dissipated as it emerged into the Gulf of St. Lawrence.

Hurricane Two 

A tropical storm formed in the Gulf of Mexico on September 14. On September 16 it reached peak intensity as an 80 mph (129 km/h) hurricane while it was within 120 miles (193 km) of the Texas coast. Although heavy rain and high tides were seen all along the Texas coast, the hurricane veered eastward, so avoiding a landfall in Texas. However, on September 18 it made landfall in Louisiana while at the same strength.
On September 19 the hurricane made another landfall at Fort Walton Beach, Florida. It quickly weakened back to a tropical storm while still in the state of Florida. It emerged into the Atlantic on September 20. The storm dissipated about 200 miles south of North Carolina on September 21.

Hurricane Three 

A Category 1 hurricane was first discovered on September 16 in the mid-North Atlantic. It moved generally to the northwest for a few days then passed safely to the northeast of Bermuda between September 18 and 19th. It weakened to a tropical storm as it was moving toward Atlantic Canada. It dissipated while just offshore of southern Newfoundland. The storm is known to have reached hurricane strength from ship reports, most notably from the Harley John, and wind reports from St. Paul Island, Canada

Hurricane Four 

On September 21, a tropical storm was first observed east of the Leeward Islands. It moved west at a low latitude, hugging the coast of South America while strengthening. It crossed over northern Venezuela on the September 23, becoming one of just a few tropical systems to hit that country. The island of Curaçao was devastated. The hurricane turned northward, weakening to a minimal Category 1 storm. It crossed the Caribbean Sea and the Gulf of Mexico, where it strengthened to a 115 mph (185 km/h) major hurricane just before landfall at Panama City Beach, Florida, on October 3. The storm became extratropical over the Carolinas on October 4. The storm caused heavy rain and flooding throughout North Carolina. Numerous ships were wrecked along the United States Atlantic coast. Overall, the hurricane was responsible for 84 deaths.

Tropical Storm Five 

On September 24 a tropical storm was discovered north of Hispaniola. It tracked through the Bahamas over the next few days. After passing the Bahamas, it moved parallel to the southeastern coast of the United States.The storm reached peak intensity on September 28. It apparently dissipated on September 29.

Tropical Storm Six 

A tropical storm was discovered roughly halfway between Bermuda and the Cape Verde Islands on October 13. It headed generally northward and did not strengthen. It became extratropical to the southeast of Cape Race on October 16. This extratropical storm lasted until October 18.

Tropical Storm Seven 

A tropical storm was first discovered on October 24 in the Gulf of Mexico. It paralleled the states of the Gulf Coast for a few days before ultimately making landfall near Cedar Key, Florida, as a tropical storm. The storm later strengthened slightly but dissipated on October 28.

Tropical Storm Eight 

A tropical storm was discovered in the vicinity of the Bahamas on November 28. It reached peak intensity on November 29. The storm became extratropical by November 30 and affected many areas of Atlantic Canada.

See also 

 Tropical cyclone observation
 Atlantic hurricane reanalysis project

References 

 
Atlantic Hurricane Season, 1877
Articles which contain graphical timelines
1877 natural disasters